Fulk of Angoulême was the eleventh count of Angoulême. He was the son of Count Geoffrey of Angoulême and Petronille De Archiac. He died in 1087 or 1089, depending on the sources.

He had a son, who succeeded him in title and territory:

William V

References

Histoire P@ssion - Chronologie historique des Comtes d’Angoulême (in French)
L'art de Verifier des Faits historiques, des Chartes, des Chroniques, et Autres Anciens Monuments, Depuis la Naissance de Notre-Seigner by Moreau et Yalade, 1818, Page 184
The coinage of the European continent, by Swan Sonnenschein, 1893,  Page 276
Annuaire Historique Pour L'annee 1854, by Société de l'histoire de France, Page 179
Nouvelle Encyclopedie Theologique, by Jacques-Paul Migne, 1854, Page 903

1080s deaths
Counts of Angoulême
Year of birth unknown
Year of death uncertain